For the borough in Westmoreland County, Pennsylvania, see Mount Pleasant, Pennsylvania

Mount Pleasant is an unincorporated community in Hilltown Township in Bucks County, Pennsylvania, United States. Mount Pleasant is located at the intersection of Pennsylvania Route 152 and Hilltown Pike.

References

Unincorporated communities in Bucks County, Pennsylvania
Unincorporated communities in Pennsylvania